Đorđe Vajfert (15 July 185012 January 1937) was a Serbian industrialist, Governor of the National Bank of Serbia and later Yugoslavia. In addition, he is considered the founder of the modern mining sector in Serbia and a great benefactor.

Biography
Georg Weifert was born in Pančevo, German Banat to a Danube Swabian family. From an early age Đorđe Vajfert worked with his father, Ignatz Weifert in Belgrade, in brewing. Theirs was the first brewery in the Kingdom of Serbia. He graduated from the Braumeisterschule in Weihenstephan, near Munich. Then he returned to Serbia and took over the brewery of his father, which he expanded. With the profits he bought a coal mine in Kostolac, then a copper mine in Bor, a Steinberg works at Zaječar and finally a gold mine. With the proceeds from the mines, he was the richest man in Serbia and was considered the greatest industrialist of the future Yugoslavia.

In 1890 Vajfert was appointed Governor of the National Bank of Serbia. He served in this capacity from 1890 to 1902, and again from 1912 to 1914/1918. During this period he acquired a good reputation maintaining the value of the Serbian dinar and in credit. After 1918, because of his good offices, Vajfert was appointed Governor of the National Bank of Yugoslavia. His best-known arrangement as Governor was the conversion of the Austro-Hungarian krone into the new Yugoslav dinar. This also led to great criticism, as the former Serbian dinar was exchanged 1:1 in the new dinar, the Austrian money into a 4:1 ratio – this led to substantial losses of property of those Yugoslavs who formerly lived in Austria-Hungary. 

Đorđe Vajfert was an important patron and supporter of humanitarian and cultural institutions. He donated his prized collection of ancient coins and his private library to the University of Belgrade. In Pančevo, from where his parents Ignatz and Anna originated, he left the Roman Catholic Church a small chapel known as Anina crkva (Anna's church), in memory of his mother.

Vajfert was a major benefactor in the opening of a large Catholic cemetery in Pancevo where the remains of many family members of Vajfert remain. They also built up a fund for Pancevo St. Anne Catholic Church and many other public and charitable institutions.

Vajfert died on 12 January 1937, at 17:20 pm at his villa in Belgrade. The funeral service was held in the Catholic Church of St. Anne Pancevo 14 January, and the 15th he was buried in the Catholic cemetery Pančevo. The heir to his business empire was his nephew Ferdinand Gramberg. 

Since 2001, his portrait is depicted on the 1000 Serbian dinar note. He was awarded the Order of Saint Sava, Order of Karađorđe's Star and Order of the White Eagle.

See also
 Luka Ćelović
 Nikola Spasić
 Miša Anastasijević
 Stanojlo Petrović
 Marija Trandafil
 Sava Tekelija
 Stanojlo Petrović
 Sava Vukovic (merchant)

References

Sources
 Management Giants - Georg Weifert, Profit Magazin, Retrieved on 2017-04-01. 
 The Knight of Serbia, Georg I. Weifert (1850-1937), Association of Serbian Banks, Retrieved on 2017-04-01. 
 Archives of the city of Belgrade, TD, Building dept. F-H-9-1930, file I -165-1942.
 The early years . Led-vajfert.org. Accessed on 2011-12-29
 Politics, no. 10,287 from Wednesday 13 January 1937th, str. 5
 Politics, no. 10,289 from Friday 15 January 1937th, str. 6
 Politics, no. 10,290 from Saturday 16 January 1937th, str. 6
 Saša Ilić, Sonja Jerković, Vladimir Bulajić (2010). Georg Weifert – Visionary and Enthusiast: The Illustrated Personal and Professional Biography 1850–1937. Belgrade: National Bank of Serbia. https://www.academia.edu/44579410/%C4%90or%C4%91e_Vajfert_vizionar_i_pregalac_li%C4%8Dna_i_poslovna_ilustrovana_biografija_1850_1937_Georg_Weifert_Visionary_and_Enthusiast_The_Illustrated_Personal_and_Professional_Biography_1850_1937_

1850 births
1937 deaths
People from Pančevo
19th-century Serbian people
20th-century Serbian people
Governors of the National Bank of Serbia
Governors of the National Bank of Yugoslavia
Serbian businesspeople
Serbian Roman Catholics
Serbian numismatists
Serbian philanthropists
People of Hungarian German descent
Danube-Swabian people
Serbian people of German descent
Yugoslav people of German descent
Recipients of the Order of St. Sava
Austro-Hungarian people
Austro-Hungarian emigrants to Serbia
Immigrants to the Principality of Serbia